The 100 Cycle Challenge is the biggest autumn road race for cyclists from across Gauteng Province and the rest of South Africa. It takes place annually on the first Sunday in May and is presented on a 100 kilometer circuit route that begins and ends at Germiston Lake in the City of Ekurhuleni, east of Johannesburg. 

The 2nd annual 100 Cycle Challenge was last held on Sunday, 5 May 2019.

It was announced there will not be an annual 100 Cycle Challenge race held for 2020, and the next scheduled race is Sunday, 2 May 2021.

It is currently rated by the UCI as category 1.2.

Overall winners

References 

Road bicycle races
Cycle races in South Africa
UCI Africa Tour races
Recurring sporting events established in 2018